Maria Westberg (1853–1893), was a Swedish ballerina. 

A student of the Royal Swedish Ballet in 1860, a second dancer in 1870; active at the Royal Danish Ballet in 1872-90.

References 
 Svenskt porträttgalleri / XXI. Tonkonstnärer och sceniska artister (biografier af Adolf Lindgren & Nils Personne)

1853 births
Swedish ballerinas
1893 deaths
19th-century Swedish ballet dancers